Parian marble is a fine-grained semi translucent pure-white and entirely flawless marble quarried during the classical era on the Greek island of Paros in the Aegean Sea.

It was highly prized by ancient Greeks for making sculptures. Some of the greatest masterpieces of ancient Greek sculpture were carved from Parian marble, including the Medici Venus, the Venus de Milo, and the Winged Victory of Samothrace.

The original quarries, which were used from the 6th century BC onwards, can still be seen on the north side of the island on the slopes of its central peak.  The Parian's main rival in antiquity was Pentelic marble, which is also flawless white, albeit with a uniform, faint yellow tint that makes it shine with a golden hue under sunlight. It is today mined mostly on the neighbour island of Paros, Naxos, in the mountains near the village of Kinidaros.

Parian ware is an artificial substitute for marble, originally a brand name for a variety of unglazed biscuit porcelain, developed in 1842 in England.  This is cast in moulds, typically for small busts and figurines, rather than carved.

Notable uses
 Venus de Milo
 Peplos Kore
 Lycian sarcophagus of Sidon
 Statue of Augustus from Prima Porta
 Hermes and the Infant Dionysus
 Parthenon's roof tiles
 Napoleon's tomb

References

 The Concise Oxford Dictionary of Archaeology, Timothy Darvill (2002)

External links
 Parian Marble: Famous statues of Parian Marble

Marble
Arts in ancient Greece
Quarries in Greece